Flavobacterium collinsense is a Gram-negative, aerobic and rod-shaped bacterium from the genus of Flavobacterium which has been isolated from till from the Collins glacier front on the Antarctica.

References

External links
Type strain of Flavobacterium collinsense at BacDive -  the Bacterial Diversity Metadatabase

collinsense
Bacteria described in 2016